The Allgäu Formation is a geologic formation in Austria. It preserves fossils dating back to the Hettangian to Sinemurian stages of the Early Jurassic period, or Raricostatum to Obtusum in the regional stratigraphy. Initially and formally defined by Jacobshagen (1965). The Allgäu Formation is formerly known as spotted marls (Lias-Fleckenmergel) and spotted marly limestones (Fleckenkalk). The formation is represented by dark-grey bioturbated limestones and marlstone interbeds. It represents basinal hemipelagic facies common in Alpine Tethys regions of Alps, Carpathians and other mountain ranges. Several horizons of the formation are particularly rich in ammonite fauna.

Fossil content 
Fish
 Agkistracanthus sp.

Ammonites
 Echioceras raricostatoides
 Epophioceras landrioti
 Leptechioceras meigeni
 Asteroceras cf. suevicum
 Juraphyllites sp.
 Paltechioceras sp.
 Villania sp.

Rhynchonellata
 Carapezzia engadinensis
 Sulcirostra doesseggeri
 Sulcirostra cf. zitteli

See also 
 List of fossiliferous stratigraphic units in Austria
 List of fossiliferous stratigraphic units in Germany
 List of fossiliferous stratigraphic units in Switzerland

References

Bibliography 

 Gawlick, H.J., Missoni, S., Schlagintweit, F., Suzuki, H., Frisch, W., Krystyn, L., Blau, J. & Lein, R., 2009, Jurassic Tectonostratigraphy of the Austroalpine Domain. Journal of Alpine Geology, 50, p. 1–152
 H. Sulser and H. Furrer. 2008. Dimerelloid rhynchonellide brachiopods in the Lower Jurassic of the Engadine (Canton Graubünden, National Park, Switzerland). Swiss Journal of Geosciences 101:203-222
 J. Blau. 1998. Monographie der Ammoniten des Obersinemuriums (Lotharingium, Lias) der Lienzer Dolomiten (Österreich): Biostratigraphie, Systematik und Paläobiogeographie. Revue de Paléobiologie, Genève 17:177-285
 C. J. Duffin and H. Furrer. 1981. Myriacanthid holocephalan remains from the Rhaetian (Upper Triassic) and Hettangian (Lower Jurassic) of Graubünden (Switzerland). Eclogae Geologicae Helvetiae 74:803-829
 Jacobshagen, V. von, 1965, Die Allgäu-Schichten (Jura-Fleckenmergel) zwischen Wettersteingebirge und Rhein. Jb. Geol. B. A., 108, pp. 1–114

Geologic formations of Austria
Geologic formations of Germany
Geologic formations of Switzerland
Jurassic System of Europe
Jurassic Austria
Jurassic Germany
Hettangian Stage
Sinemurian Stage
Jurassic Switzerland
Marl formations
Limestone formations
Open marine deposits
Paleontology in Austria
Paleontology in Germany
Paleontology in Switzerland
Northern Limestone Alps